Córrego Fundo is a Brazilian municipality located in the center of the state of Minas Gerais. Its population  was 6,382 people living in a total area of 105 km². The city belongs to the meso-region of Oeste de Minas and to the micro-region of Formiga.  It became a municipality in 1995.

Location
The city center of Córrego Fundo is located at an elevation of 844 meters a short distance west of Formiga.  It is connected to Formiga, Divinópolis, and Belo Horizonte by highway MG-050.  Neighboring  municipalities are:  Arcos (N and NW),  Formiga (E and S), and Pains (W).

Distances to other cities
Belo Horizonte/MG - 200 km
Formiga/MG - 8 km
Piumhi/MG - 50 km
Divinópolis/MG - 83 km

Economic activities
Services and industry are the most important economic activities.  In 2005 there were 16 extractive industries (mining) and 143 transformation industries.  Transformation industries employed 701 workers.  The GDP in 2005 was approximately R$66 million, 8 million reais from taxes, 23 million reais from services, 30 million reais from industry, and 4 million reais from agriculture.  There were 414 rural producers on 5,000 hectares of land (2006).  24 farms had tractors (2006).  Approximately 900 persons were involved in agriculture.  The main crops are coffee, rice, beans, and corn.  There were 4,000 head of cattle (2006).

There were no banks (2007).  The motor vehicle fleet had 848 automobiles, 279 trucks, 66 pickup trucks, and 269 motorcycles.

Health and education
In the health sector there were 2 public health clinics (2005).  Patients with more serious health conditions are transported to Formiga or Divinópolis.  Educational needs of 1,000 students were met by 3 primary schools, 1 middle school, and 2 pre-primary schools.

Municipal Human Development Index: 0.678 (2010)
National ranking: 2481 out of 5,565 municipalities 
Literacy rate: 88%
Life expectancy: 70 (average of males and females)

In 2000 the per capita monthly income of R$169.00 was well below the state and national average of R$276.00 and R$297.00 respectively.  Poços de Caldas had the highest per capita monthly income in 2000 with R$435.00.  The lowest was Setubinha with R$73.00.

The highest ranking municipality in Minas Gerais in 2000 was Poços de Caldas with 0.841, while the lowest was Setubinha with 0.568.  Nationally the highest was São Caetano do Sul in São Paulo with 0.919, while the lowest was Setubinha.  In more recent statistics (considering 5,507 municipalities) Manari in the state of Pernambuco has the lowest rating in the country—0,467—putting it in last place.

References

See also
 List of municipalities in Minas Gerais

Municipalities in Minas Gerais